The Chinese Ambassador to Norway is the official representative of the People's Republic of China to the Kingdom of Norway.

List of representatives

References 

 
Norway
China